Volturnus Lake is the roughly triangular lake extending 225 m in north–south direction and 215 m in east–west direction on the southwest coast of Livingston Island in the South Shetland Islands, Antarctica. Its surface area is 3.15 ha. The area was visited by early 19th century sealers.

The feature is named after Volturnus, a Roman deity of water and rivers.

Location
Detailed Spanish mapping in 1992, and Bulgarian mapping of the area in 2009 and 2017.

Maps
 Península Byers, Isla Livingston. Mapa topográfico a escala 1:25000. Madrid: Servicio Geográfico del Ejército, 1992
 L. Ivanov. Antarctica: Livingston Island and Greenwich, Robert, Snow and Smith Islands. Scale 1:120000 topographic map. Troyan: Manfred Wörner Foundation, 2009. 
 L. Ivanov. Antarctica: Livingston Island and Smith Island. Scale 1:100000 topographic map. Manfred Wörner Foundation, 2017. 
 Antarctic Digital Database (ADD). Scale 1:250000 topographic map of Antarctica. Scientific Committee on Antarctic Research (SCAR). Since 1993, regularly upgraded and updated

See also
 Antarctic lakes
 Livingston Island

Notes

References
 Volturnus Lake. SCAR Composite Gazetteer of Antarctica
 Bulgarian Antarctic Gazetteer. Antarctic Place-names Commission. (details in Bulgarian, basic data in English)
 Management Plan for Antarctic Specially Protected Area No. 126 Byers Peninsula. Measure 4 (2016), ATCM XXXIX Final Report. Santiago, 2016

External links
 Volturnus Lake. Adjusted Copernix satellite image

Bodies of water of Livingston Island
Lakes of the South Shetland Islands
Bulgaria and the Antarctic